Boscobel may refer to:

Locations
 Boscobel, Jamaica
 Boscobel, Shropshire, England
 Boscobel, Wisconsin, United States
 Boscobel (town), Wisconsin, United States

Other
 Boscobel House, a former hunting lodge at Boscobel, Shropshire, associated with the escape of Charles II after the Battle of Worcester.
 Boscobel (mansion), Garrison, New York, United States
 Boscobel (Nebraska City, Nebraska), historic house in Nebraska City, Nebraska

See also
 Boscobel Aerodrome
 Boscobel Airport
 Boscobel College
 Boscobel Cottage
 The Boscobel Dial
 Boscobel Grand Army of the Republic Hall
 Boscobel High School
 Boscabel, Western Australia